Cohagen is an unincorporated community in southeastern Garfield County, Montana, United States.  It lies along Highway 59 southeast of the town of Jordan, the county seat of Garfield County.  Its elevation is 2,720 feet (829 m).

History
Cohagen's post office, with the ZIP code of 59322, opened on August 18, 1905. The town name is the mother's maiden name of the first postmaster Harry Harris.

In September 2020, Cohagen was evacuated due to wildfire threat.

Climate
According to the Köppen Climate Classification system, Cohagen has a semi-arid climate, abbreviated "BSk" on climate maps.

References

Unincorporated communities in Garfield County, Montana
Unincorporated communities in Montana